Mohamed Thiam (born 22 June 1996) is a Guinean footballer.

External links 
 

1996 births
Living people
Guinean footballers
Guinea international footballers
Association football midfielders
Guinea A' international footballers
2016 African Nations Championship players
2018 African Nations Championship players